Georgia Octavia Hirst (born 26 December 1994) is an English actress. She is known for her roles as the maiden Torvi in the History series Vikings (2014–2020) and Becky in the zombie horror movie Ravers (2018).

Early life
Hirst was born on Boxing Day in Oxford. She is the daughter of writer Michael Hirst. Her older half-sister Maude Hirst appeared alongside her in Vikings. Hirst trained in acting at the Drama Centre London.

Career
Hirst dedicated most of her early acting career to playing the character Torvi in the television series Vikings; the character debuted in the second season in 2013. She was promoted to series regular during the sixth season.

In 2018, Hirst was the sole actor in the Stephen Gates directed short film Dungeness, and starred as Becky in the 2018 techno music zombie horror movie Ravers, which had its world premiere at the 2018 London FrightFest Film Festival. In 2020, Hirst played the role of Grace in the interactive rom-com Five Dates.

Philanthropy
In 2021, Hirst joined The Celebs to record a cover of The Beatles classic "Let It Be", in support of the Mind charity and released on 3rd December 2021. Hirst was part of a choir of celebrities including Anne Hegerty, Ivan Kaye and Eunice Olumide, who were backing EastEnders actress Shona McGarty.

Personal life
In 2017, Hirst made an appearance on Sky News where she urged young female fans to go ahead with smear tests after she had herself been diagnosed with precancerous cells at the age of 22. Hirst followed this by appearing in a Mika Simmons podcast, The Happy Vagina on the same topic.

Filmography

Film and television

Music video

Video games

References

External links 
 
 Georgia Hirst  United Agents

Living people
1994 births
21st-century English actresses
Actors from Oxford
Alumni of the Drama Centre London
English film actresses
English television actresses